Events from the year 1536 in France

Incumbents
 Monarch – Francis I

Events
 War resumes between Francis I of France and Charles V, Holy Roman Emperor. Francis seizes control of Savoy and captures Turin. Charles triumphally enters Rome following the Via Triuphalis and delivers a speech before the pope and college of cardinals publicly challenging the king of France to a duel.

Births
 February 2 – Scévole de Sainte-Marthe, French poet (d. 1623)

Deaths
 Jacques Lefèvre d'Étaples, French theologian and humanist (b. c. 1450)

See also

References

1530s in France